Calcaño is a surname. Notable people with the surname include:

Héctor Calcaño (1894–1969), Argentine actor
María Calcaño (1906–1956), Venezuelan poet
Mary Calcaño (1906–1992), first Venezuelan woman to be granted a pilot's licence
Graciela Rincón Calcaño (1904–1987), Venezuelan writer and poet
 Rafael Devers Calcaño (born 1996), baseballer